Claribel Medina (born December 16, 1961 in San Juan) is a Puerto Rican actress who has acted for soap operas and movies filmed both in her native Puerto Rico and in Argentina.

Biography 
Claribel started her artistic career in the early 1980s when an opera singer, Alex Vázquez, chose her to have a role in the musical production "The passion and death of Our Lord Jesus Christ."

See also 
 List of Puerto Ricans
 Raquel Montero

References

External links 
 

1961 births
Living people
People from San Juan, Puerto Rico
Puerto Rican film actresses
Puerto Rican stage actresses
Puerto Rican telenovela actresses
Puerto Rican emigrants to Argentina
20th-century Puerto Rican actresses
21st-century Puerto Rican actresses
Naturalized citizens of Argentina